Against the Law is the fifth release, and fifth studio album, from the Christian metal band Stryper, released on August 21, 1990. Three singles and videos were released for this album including "Shining Star" (an Earth, Wind & Fire cover), "Two Time Woman" and "Lady" but received minimal airplay.

This album marked a change in the musical and visual direction of the band. Gone were the yellow and black spandex outfits, the bold evangelical lyrics and the original band logo with Isaiah 53:5. In their place were leather outfits, and lyrics more focused on rock n' roll and relationships, although arguably from a Christian worldview. The album sold poorly compared to the band's previous gold and platinum releases.

Track listing 

All songs by Michael Sweet except where noted.
 "Against the Law" – 3:49
 "Two Time Woman" – 3:40
 "Rock the People" – 3:34
 "Two Bodies (One Mind, One Soul)" – 5:17
 "Not That Kind of Guy" – 3:59
 "Shining Star" (Philip Bailey, Larry Dunn, Maurice White) – 4:22
 "Ordinary Man" – 3:51
 "Lady" – 4:53
 "Caught in the Middle" – 3:48
 "All for One" – 4:31
 "Rock the Hell Out of You" – 3:35

Personnel 
Stryper
 Michael Sweet – lead vocals, backing vocals, guitars
 Oz Fox – lead guitars, backing vocals
 Tim Gaines – bass (1-5, 7-11), backing vocals 
 Robert Sweet – drums

Additional musicians
 John Purdell – keyboards
 Brent Jeffers – additional keyboards
 Randy Jackson – bass (6)
 Tom Werman – percussion
 Jeff Scott Soto – backing vocals

Production 
 Tom Werman – producer
 John Guarnieri – A&R direction 
 Jacqui Randle – A&R administration 
 Eddie DeLena – engineer, mixing
 Mike Bosley – assistant engineer
 Lawrence Ethan – assistant engineer
 Buzz Morrows – assistant engineer, mix assistant
 Patrick Pending – art direction
 Rudy Tuesday – art direction, design
 David Perry – special photo printing
 Ed Colver – still life photography
 Neil Zlozower – band photography
 Jeannine Pinkerton – typesetting
 Kyle Tucy Sweet – make-up
 Fleur Thiemeyer – wardrobe

Studios
 Recorded at Music Grinder Studios (Hollywood, California) and Devonshire Sound Studios (North Hollywood, California).
 Mixed at Record Plant (Hollywood, California).

Alternative versions 

A limited edition version of the album was also released that included a 14-minute interview with the band.

Title of the album 

Tim Gaines said the album was titled Against the Law because it was, "our response to these religious folks who Christ said "They swallow a camel and strain on a gnat." In other words: in response to the criticism from Christians protesting against them.

References 

1990 albums
Stryper albums
Albums produced by Tom Werman
Enigma Records albums